Joseph Stephenson (1723 – 19 July 1810) was an English composer of West Gallery music. He was born in Poole, Dorset, in 1723; baptised on 17 October 1723; and died in Poole on 19 July 1810.

References

External links

1723 births
1810 deaths
18th-century British composers
18th-century British male musicians
English male composers
People from Poole
English Unitarians
19th-century British composers
19th-century British male musicians